Paul Sullivan may refer to:

Paul Sullivan (composer) (born 1955), American composer and writer
Paul Sullivan (footballer) (born 1937), Australian footballer
Paul Sullivan (radio) (1957–2007), former radio talk show host for WBZ in Boston
Paul Sullivan (tennis) (born 1941), American tennis player
Paul E. Sullivan, U.S. Navy admiral

See also
Paul O'Sullivan (disambiguation)